Aja or AJA may refer to:

Acronyms
AJ Auxerre, a French football club
Ajaccio Napoleon Bonaparte Airport's IATA airport code
Al Jazeera America, an American news channel
American Jewish Archives
American Journal of Archaeology
, a German organization of non-profit youth exchange groups
The Association of Japanese Animations
Australian Journalists Association, part of the Media, Entertainment and Arts Alliance

Anthropology
Aja people, a people living in Benin
Aja language (Niger–Congo), the language of the Aja people, part of the Gbe dialect continuum
Aja people (South Sudan), an ethnic group living in South Sudan
Aja language (Nilo-Saharan), a language spoken in Sudan

Gods
Aja (Hindu mythology), a prince of the Ikshvaku dynasty
Aja (orisha), a Yoruba spirit
 Aja, another name of the Hindu god Shiva

Music
Aja (album), a 1977 Steely Dan album 
 "Aja" (song), the title track of that album
Aja!, a 2015 Maija Vilkkumaa album

People
Aja (name)
Aja (entertainer) (born 1994), drag performer and television personality

Places
Aja Mountain, a mountain in Ha'il, Saudi Arabia
Ajjah, a Palestinian village in the Jenin Governorate in the northern West Bank

See also

 
 

Language and nationality disambiguation pages